Kathy Sheehy (born April 26, 1970), nicknamed "Gubba", is an American water polo player, who won the silver medal at the 2000 Summer Olympics and was inducted into the USA Water Polo Hall of Fame in 2010.

Kathy attended  San Diego State University.
She  coached the U.S. Senior B national team, and coaches high school teams.

See also
 List of Olympic medalists in water polo (women)

References

External links
 

1970 births
Living people
American female water polo players
Olympic silver medalists for the United States in water polo
Water polo players at the 2000 Summer Olympics
Medalists at the 2000 Summer Olympics
American water polo coaches
San Diego State Aztecs women's water polo players
People from Moraga, California